The Noua-Sabatinovka-Coslogeni complex was a late Bronze Age archaeological cultural complex located in Ukraine, Moldova and Romania, dating from the 14th to 11th centuries BC, consisting of the closely-related Noua, Sabatinovka and Coslogeni cultures. The complex originated from a westward migration related to the Srubnaya culture from the steppe and forest-steppe region north of the Black Sea, combined with the preceding Monteoru culture in Moldova and Romania. It was succeeded by the Urnfield culture (Gava culture) and the Belozerka culture.

Gallery

See also 

 Prehistory of Transylvania
 Bronze Age in Romania
 Urnfield culture
 Gava culture

References 

Archaeological cultures of Central Europe
Archaeological cultures of Eastern Europe
Bronze Age cultures of Europe
Archaeological cultures in Romania
Archaeological cultures in Moldova
Archaeological cultures in Ukraine